Tillandsia flexuosa, the twisted airplant, is a species of bromeliad in the genus Tillandsia. This species is native to Central America, southeastern Mexico (Veracruz, Yucatán Peninsula), northern South America (Colombia, Venezuela, Guianas) and the United States (Florida).

References

flexuosa
Flora of Central America
Flora of Mexico
Flora of South America
Flora of Florida
Flora of the Caribbean
Plants described in 1788